"Heavy on My Heart" is a song by American recording artist Anastacia from her third studio album, Anastacia (2004). Written by Anastacia and Billy Mann, its arrangement is built on simple guitar riffs, and its lyrics chronicle Anastacia's battle with breast cancer. The song was released as the album's fourth and final single on March 7, 2005, and entered the top 20 in Hungary, Italy, the Netherlands, and Spain. A French version of the song, titled "Trop lourd dans mon coeur" (meaning "Too Heavy on My Heart"), appears as a B-side to the single.

Critical reception
AllMusic editor Matthew Chisling described this song: "a shimmering ballad flushed by pain, love, and bombastic sounds that collide like tidal waves in what can only be described as a magical four minutes." Yahoo! Music editor Dann Genoe wrote: "Power ballad "Heavy On My Heart" is prime for a soft focus video."

Music video
The music video was directed by Ronald Vietz and filmed in Bucharest, Romania. It was inspired by Hans Christian Andersen's fairy tale "The Steadfast Tin Soldier".

In the video, Anastacia is shown as a mannequin, which falls in love with another mannequin. At the chorus she breaks the window and runs to the male mannequin. They dance in the snow and fall in love. The two then run into a room and make out. Later, the shop in which they are displayed goes out of business. All of the shop's materials are thrown away and sent to some sort of factory where a fire burns. They end up being melted in a fire and while holding hands, their shapes are contorted into the image of a heart. The video also shows Anastacia singing in a dark green room. She is dressed in all black which conceals all of her but her head and hands.

Track listings
UK and Australian CD single
 "Heavy on My Heart" – 4:27
 "Underground Army" – 4:15
 "Trop lourd dans mon coeur" – 4:27
 "Special Thanks (Spoken Word)" – 1:30
 "Heavy on My Heart" (video) – 4:27

European CD single
 "Heavy on My Heart" – 4:27
 "Underground Army" – 4:15

Credits and personnel
Credits are taken from the Anastacia album booklet.

Studios
 Recorded at Record Plant (Hollywood, California), Record One, and Larrabee East (Los Angeles)
 Vocals recorded at Henson Studios (Los Angeles)
 Mixed at Image Studios (Los Angeles)
 Mastered at Sterling Sound (New York City)

Personnel

 Anastacia – writing, vocals, background vocals
 Billy Mann – writing, background vocals, production (vocals)
 Michael Landau – guitars
 Tim Pierce – guitars
 Lance Morrison – bass
 Glen Ballard – keyboards, production
 Randy Kerber – keyboards
 Matt Laug – drums
 Bill Malina – recording
 Mike Fennel – recording (vocals)
 Chris Lord-Alge – mixing
 Keith Armstrong – assistant mix engineering
 Anthony Kilhoffer – assistant engineering
 J.D. Andrew – assistant engineering
 Tom Sweeney – assistant engineering
 Jeff Burns – assistant engineering
 Ted Jensen – mastering

Charts

Weekly charts

Year-end charts

Release history

References

2000s ballads
2004 songs
2005 singles
Anastacia songs
Charity singles
Epic Records singles
Songs written by Anastacia
Songs written by Billy Mann